The 2023 Channel One Trophy was a Russian domestic team figure skating competition held from 21 to 22 January 2023 in Mocow, Russia. Single skaters who placed in the top eight and pairs who placed in the top 4 at the 2023 Russian Championships were invited to compete.

Skaters competed against each other in two teams consisting of four men's single skaters, four ladies' single skaters and two pair teams. Four ice dance teams were invited to show their programs but did not contribute to the points gathered by the teams. The teams were randomly selected by draw by team captains Kamila Valieva and Alina Zagitova.

The competition was broadcast by Channel One Russia and was made available to international viewers via YouTube.

Entries

Changes to preliminary entries

Teams 

*Note: Ice dancers did not take part in the competition and did not contribute to the total point standing of the teams.

Competition schedule 
The competition was broadcast by Channel One Russia.

Listed in local time (UTC+03:00).

Results

Team

Men

Women

Pairs

Notes

References 

Channel One